is the third studio album by Japanese entertainer Miho Nakayama. Released through King Records on July 1, 1986, the album features the single "Close Up". "You're My Only Shinin' Star" was initially not released as a single, but popular demand prompted Nakayama to re-record the song as a stand-alone single, which hit No. 1 in 1988.

The album peaked at No. 8 on Oricon's albums chart and sold over 77,000 copies.

Track listing

Charts

References

External links
 
 
 

1986 albums
Miho Nakayama albums
Japanese-language albums
King Records (Japan) albums